Anandha Ragam is a 2022 Indian Tamil-language family drama series starring Anusha Prathap and Alagappan. It premiered on Sun TV on 29 August 2022 available for worldwide streaming on Sun NXT.

Cast

Main
 Anusha Prathap as Eshwari – Shanmugavel and Meenakshi's elder daughter; Abhirami's sister
 Samyuktha as Child Eshwari
 Alagappan as Azhagu Sundaram – Vasundhara's son; Shilpa's fiancé
 Neelesh as Child Azhagu Sundaram

Supporting 
 Preethi Sanjiv as Vasundhara – Sampath's sister; Azhagu Sundaram's mother
 Swetha Senthilkumar as Abhirami aka Abhi – Shanmugavel and Meenakshi's younger daughter; Eshwari's sister
 Indhu Chowdary as Shilpa – Saranya's daughter; Azhagu Sundaram's fiancée
 Ranjan Kumar as Shakti – Manga's brother; Durga's husband
 Sangeetha V as Durga Shakthi – Shakti's wife
 Sivaranjani Vijay as Girija – Sampath's wife; Divya's mother
 Parthan Siva as Sampath – Vasundhara's brother; Girija's husband; Divya's father
 Rindhu Ravi as Mangai – Shakti's sister; Ramya's mother
 Reehana as Saranya – Shilpa's mother
 Vaishali Thaniga as Divya – Girija and Sampath's daughter
 Sebastian as Theekuchi – Azhagu Sundaram's best friend
 Megna Jayakrishnaraj as Ramya – Mangai's daughter
 Anjali Varadharajan as Vyjayanthi – Thyagarajan's wife; Sanjeev's mother
 Sivakumar as Thyagarajan – Meenakshi's brother; Vyjayanthi's husband; Sanjeev's father
 Barath Guru as Sanjeev – Vyjayanthi and Thyagarajan's son

Special Appearances
 Ilavarasu as Inspector Shanmugavel aka Shanmugam – Meenakshi's husband; Eshwari and Abhirami's father (Dead)
 Vinodhini Vaidyanathan as Meenakshi – Thyagarajan's sister; Shanmugavel's wife; Eshwari and Abhirami's mother (Dead)

Adaptations

References

External links
 Anandha Ragam at Sun Network.in
 Anandha Ragam at Sun NXT

Sun TV original programming
Tamil-language television soap operas
2022 Tamil-language television series debuts
Television shows set in Tamil Nadu
Tamil-language melodrama television series
Tamil-language television shows